Lissy Samuel (born 11 December 1967) is a former One Day International cricketer who represented India. She played one One Day International. She is a right-hand batsman and bowls right-arm medium fast.

References

Living people
Cricketers from Chennai
1967 births
Indian women cricketers
India women One Day International cricketers
Tamil Nadu women cricketers